Warren's Gate, first described by nineteenth century surveyor Charles Warren, is an ancient entrance into the Temple platform in Jerusalem which lies about  into the Western Wall Tunnel. In the Second Temple period, the gate led to a tunnel and staircase onto the Temple Mount.

After the Rashidun Caliphate conquest of Jerusalem from the Byzantines, Jews were allowed to pray inside the tunnel. The synagogue was destroyed in the First Crusade in the siege of Jerusalem in 1099.  The tunnel then became a water cistern, thus its name Cistern 30.

The area is surrounded by a vaulted  tunnel.

Rabbi Yehuda Getz, the late official Rabbi of the Western Wall, believed that the Gate represented the point west of the Wall closest to the Holy of Holies. An underground dispute broke out in July 1981 between Jewish explorers inside Warren's Gate and Arab guards who came down to meet them through surface cistern entries. A small underground riot ensued which was only stopped when the Jerusalem police came in to restore the peace.

References

Jews and Judaism in the Roman Empire
Gates
Historic sites in Jerusalem
Synagogues in Jerusalem
Temple Mount